Don Nottingham (born June 26, 1949) is a former American football running back who played for the Baltimore Colts and Miami Dolphins of the National Football League.  He was affectionately referred to as 'The Human Bowling Ball' because of his short but robust frame.

Early career and college
He attended Ravenna High School in Ravenna, Ohio and played college football at nearby Kent State University.  He was a three-year letterman, and captained the team his senior year.  He finished his college career with 2,515 yards on 602 carries.  He also made the first-team All-Mid-American Conference teams in 1969 and 1970. Nottingham's Golden Flashes teammates included future head coaches Gary Pinkel (Toledo, Missouri) and Nick Saban (Toledo, Michigan State, LSU, Alabama).

Professional career
Nottingham was selected in the 17th round of the 1971 NFL Draft by the Baltimore Colts, the second to last pick.  He spent two full years with the team, and was traded midway through the 1973 NFL season to the Dolphins.  He was part of the Dolphins team that won Super Bowl VIII over the Minnesota Vikings 24-7.  He gained the starting role after Larry Csonka left for the World Football League in 1975 and finished in the top ten of all running backs for rushing touchdowns during the 1974, 1975, and 1976 seasons. Nottingham broke his left shoulder blade in August 1978 and sat out the entire 1978 season on injured reserve, then retired in March 1979 to sell insurance. He finished his career with 2,496 yards and 34 touchdowns on 611 carries, as well as 67 catches for 502 yards.

Career statistics

Regular season

References

External links
Don Nottingham at Kent State's website

1949 births
Living people
People from Clay County, West Virginia
People from Ravenna, Ohio
Players of American football from Ohio
American football running backs
Kent State Golden Flashes football players
Baltimore Colts players
Miami Dolphins players